Johnathan Davis is the CEO of IBT Media and co-owner of Newsweek with Dev Pragad. He is the husband of Olivet University president Tracy McBeal Davis; they are both members of the Olivet sect, followers of evangelical pastor David Jang.

In 2013, Davis and Etienne Uzac, the co-founders of IBT Media, purchased Newsweek, forming Newsweek Media Group.

In 2018, Newsweek Media Group split, with Newsweek under the ownership of Davis and Pragad, and IBT Media under the ownership of Davis and Uzac.

References 

21st-century American businesspeople
IBT Media

Living people
Year of birth missing (living people)
University of California, Los Angeles alumni